Lashak (also Romanized as Lāshak) is a village in Zanus Rastaq Rural District, Kojur District, Nowshahr County, Mazandaran Province, Iran. At the 2006 census, its population was 214, in 83 families.

References 

Populated places in Nowshahr County